Silvia is a given name and surname. Silvia may also refer to:

Silvia, Cauca, a municipality in the Cauca Department, Colombia
Nissan Silvia, an automobile sold in Japan
Silvia is the name of two plant genera:
Silvia in family Orobanchaceae
Silvia in family Lauraceae
Silvia anacardioides, S. polyantha, and S. rondonii have been moved to Mezia itauba
Other species have been moved to genus Mezilaurus
Anilios silvia, species of snake in the family Typhlopidae
Piezocera silvia, species of beetle in the family Cerambycidae
Rhea Silvia, in Roman mythology
Silvia (gens), legendary family in Roman mythology
 Silvia, a character in William Shakespeare's play The Two Gentlemen of Verona, the love interest of protagonist Valentine
 Silvia, a character in the Viewtiful Joe series
 Silvia, the original name of the character Sylvando in the Japanese version of Dragon Quest XI
"Silvia" (song), a song by the Swedish indie pop band Miike Snow
 SILVIA, Symbolically Isolated Linguistically Variable Intelligence Algorithms, an artificial intelligence platform technology created by Cognitive Code
 Silvia Rock, Duroch Islands, Antarctica
 Tropical Storm Silvia, a 1964 weather event in the Pacific

See also
 La Silvia
 Sylvia (disambiguation)